The Points Guy (TPG) is an American travel website and blog that produces sponsored news and stories on travel, on means of accumulating and using airline points and miles, on politics and credit cards, and in particular credit card reviews.  The site was founded in 2010.  At the outset, the site was a blog written by founder Brian Kelly.  By 2017, a majority of the staff were engaged in content editorial activities harnessing about fifty freelance contributors; a subset of the content serves as source material for video content.

History
Before founding TPG, Kelly worked at Morgan Stanley as an IT recruiter and ran an informal travel agency-type operation for his colleagues aimed at helping them maximize their return on earned travel reward points. While still working for Morgan-Stanley, Kelly launched The Points Guy blog in 2010, where he reviewed travelers’ frequent flyer miles, credit card points, and travel goals. He continued to book vacations. TPG began monetizing content through affiliate marketing in Feb 2011, which became the major source of the company's revenue. Shortly thereafter, Kelly quit his job at Morgan Stanley.

In 2012, Bankrate, a company that publishes and promotes financial content, acquired TPG.  In a 2014 interview, Brian Kelly stated: "I still have a vested ownership interest in TPG and I retain 100% editorial control".  

Between 2012 and 2017, ThePointsGuy supplemented its growth through the acquisition of competitors Million Mile Secrets, Mommy Points, and Travel is Free. 

In 2016, TPG started Points for Peace, a partnership with the nonprofit PeaceJam Foundation, which donates frequent flyer miles to help Nobel Peace Prize winners travel to developing countries.

As of 2017, Brian Kelly was number one on the Forbes list of Top Influencers for travel.  Bankrate was acquired by digital marketing company Red Ventures in 2017. The company now operates out of offices in Austin, Charlotte, New York, and London.

In 2020 Business Insider reported that multiple TPG employees had anonymously accused Kelly of fostering a toxic work environment, including drug use and abusive behavior toward staff. In response to the allegations, Red Ventures said: "Mr. Kelly unequivocally denies all allegations of drug use, sexual harassment, and assault. TPG and its parent company, Red Ventures, do not tolerate any form of harassment, exploitation, or discrimination in the workplace and take seriously their responsibility to create environments where people feel safe, respected, and able to do their best work.”

The Points Guy released an app to track airline points and miles across multiple airlines in September 2021.

TPG preemptively sued American Airlines on January 11 2022, asking a Delaware court to make it legal for customers to manage their frequent flyer data on a third-party website. The filing was in response to a cease and desist letter from American Airlines, demanding TPG not track the data of its AAdvantage members who opted-in to sharing their info with the TPG app. On January 22, 2022, American Airlines filed suit against The Points Guy in a federal court in Texas, claiming the company’s app violated its trademark and the terms of the airlines’ frequent flyer program.

Products and services 
The business receives revenue in the form of 'marketing fees' from credit card companies based on traffic from the site related to credit cards participating in loyalty programs.  Among the company's partners are Citi, Bank of America, and Chase and Capital One.

References

Further reading

External links
Official website

American travel websites
American blogs
Finance websites
Credit card rewards programs
Internet properties established in 2010
Red Ventures